is a district in Taitō, Tokyo, Japan. It is known as the location of the Sensō-ji, a Buddhist temple dedicated to the bodhisattva Kannon.

History
The development of Asakusa as an entertainment district during the Edo period came about in part because of the neighboring district, Kuramae. Kuramae was a district of storehouses for rice, which was then used as payment for servants of the feudal government. The keepers of these storage houses initially stored the rice for a small fee, but over the years began exchanging the rice for money or selling it to local shopkeepers at a margin. Through such trading, many  came to have a considerable amount of disposable income and as result theaters and geisha houses began to spring up in nearby Asakusa.

For most of the 20th century, Asakusa remained a major entertainment district in Tokyo.  The  or "Sixth District" was in particular famous as a theater district, featuring famous cinemas such as the Denkikan. The golden years of Asakusa are vividly portrayed in Yasunari Kawabata's novel The Scarlet Gang of Asakusa (1930). The area was heavily damaged by US bombing raids during World War II, particularly the 10 March 1945 firebombing of Tokyo. The area was rebuilt after the war, but has now been surpassed by Shinjuku and other colorful areas in the city, in its role as a pleasure district.

Asakusa was a ward of Tokyo City. In 1947, when the city was transformed into a metropolis, it was merged with Shitaya to form the modern Taito ward. The former ward encompassed 19 neighborhoods in the eastern half of Taitō.

Geography
Asakusa is on the north-east fringe of central Tokyo, at the eastern end of the Tokyo Metro Ginza Line subway, approximately one mile east of the major  railway/subway interchange. It is central to the area colloquially referred to as Shitamachi, which literally means "low city," referring to the low elevation of this old part of Tokyo, on the banks of the Sumida River. As the name suggests, the area has a more traditionally Japanese atmosphere than some other neighborhoods in Tokyo do.

Sightseeing and historic sites
With so many religious establishments, there are frequent  (Shinto festivals) in Asakusa, as each temple or shrine hosts at least one  a year, if not every season. Poet Matsuo Bashō referred to Asakusa's temple in a haiku.

Food and drink

Asakusa has many restaurants and places to try traditional Japanese foods. The Suzuhiro store serves local craft beer with traditional .

In a city where there are very few buildings older than 50 years because of the wartime bombing, Asakusa has a greater concentration of buildings from the 1950s and 1960s than most other areas in Tokyo do. There are traditional  (guest-houses) and small-scale apartment buildings throughout the district.

Next to the Sensō-ji temple grounds is a small amusement park called Hanayashiki, which claims to be the oldest amusement park in Japan. The neighborhood theaters specialize in showing classic Japanese films, as many of the tourists are elderly Japanese.

Cruises down the Sumida River depart from a wharf a five-minute walk from the temple.

Asakusa is Tokyo's oldest geisha district, and still has 45 actively working geisha.

Because of its colourful location, downtown credentials, and relaxed atmosphere by Tokyo standards, Asakusa is a popular accommodation choice for budget travelers.

Carnival
The neighborhood is famous for its annual Brazilian style carnival. There is a significant Brazilian presence in the local community and the Association of Samba Schools of Asakusa is based there.

In this festival,  (portable shrines) and floats are pulled through the streets while loud shouts accompany them, and during the festival's 3 days, 1.5 million people come out to celebrate.

Transportation
The district has two railway stations with the same name:

Asakusa Station

Asakusa Station

Education

Taitō City Board of Education operates public elementary and junior high schools.

In art and literature 
 Kawabata Yasunari, The Scarlet Gang of Asakusa (1930)
 Kankichi Ryotsu, protagonist of the popular anime and manga series , is born in Asakusa.
 "Corn Dog," season 1, episode 2 of Midnight Diner, Tokyo Stories, a Netflix original series (2016), is about an old comedian who works in Asakusa and his successful young protégé.
 The anime  is set in Asakusa.
 In the anime and manga series Fire Force, Asakusa shows up as the district under the jurisdiction of the Special Fire Force Company 7 and is the setting of the Asakusa arc.
 In the popular anime and manga series, Demon Slayer, chapters 14–17 and episodes 7–10, the primary location is Taishō-period Asakusa.

See also

 Asakusa Shrine
 Hanayashiki, oldest amusement park in Japan.
 
 
 Kiuchi Kyō
 Luna Park, Tokyo
 Toei Asakusa Line, a subway line named after the neighborhood

References

External links
 
 

Asakusa
Districts of Taitō